La Harpe is a surname. Notable people with the surname include:

 Amédée Emmanuel François Laharpe (1754–1796), French general and cousin of Frédéric-César
 Jean-Baptiste Bénard de la Harpe (1683–1765), French explorer
 Frédéric-César de La Harpe (1754–1838), Swiss politician and tutor to the Tsar of Russia
 Jean-François de La Harpe (1739–1803), French playwright, writer and critic